What Will Be Has Been is the first full-length studio album released by the American melodic death/black metal band Epoch of Unlight. It was the eighth release by The End Records.

Track listing
 "Ad Infinitum" (4:49)
 "Undone Within" (3:56)
 "Silver Mistress" (5:23)
 "Burning as One" (5:49)
 "...What Will Be Has Been" (5:47)
 "Crimson Might (and Glory)" (5:08)
 "(From Northern Aeries to) The Infinite Cycle of the Unborn Lord" (3:17)
 "The Day the Light Hath Died" (4:41)
 "Conflagration of Hate" (5:01)
 "Immortal Crucify" (3:54)

Personnel

Recording Line-Up
Tino LoSicco: Drums
Randy Robertson: Guitar and Vocals
Jason Smith: Guitar and Vocals
Pierce Totty: Bass

Production
Recorded at the Sound Factory
Mastered at Audiographic Masterworks
Mark Yoshida: Engineer
Mastering Engineer: Bill Pappas
Cover Art: Jose Luis de Juan
Layout Design: Dennis Gerasimenko & Sergey Makhotkin

References 

1998 debut albums
Epoch of Unlight albums
The End Records albums